The Sangh Parivar (translation: "Family of the Rashtriya Swayamsevak Sangh" or the "RSS family") refers, as an umbrella term, to the collection of Hindu nationalist organisations spawned by the Rashtriya Swayamsevak Sangh (RSS), which remain affiliated to it. These include the political party Bharatiya Janata Party, religious organisation Vishva Hindu Parishad, students union Akhil Bharatiya Vidyarthi Parishad (ABVP), religious militant organisation Bajrang Dal that forms the youth wing of the Vishva Hindu Parishad (VHP), and the worker's union Bharatiya Kisan Sangh. It is also often taken to include allied organisations such as the Shiv Sena, which share the ideology of the RSS. The Sangh Parivar represents the Hindu nationalist movement of India. Members of the Sangh Parivar or the supporters of its ideology are called Sanghis.

History
In the 1960s, the volunteers of the RSS joined the different social and political movements in India, including the Bhoodan, a land reform movement led by prominent Gandhian Vinobha Bhave and the Sarvodaya led by another Gandhian Jayaprakash Narayan. RSS also supported the formation of a trade union, the Bharatiya Mazdoor Sangh and a student's organisation Akhil Bharatiya Vidyarthi Parishad and many other organisations like Seva Bharati, Lok Bharati and Deendayal Research Institute among others.

These organisations started and supported by the RSS volunteers came to be known collectively as the Sangh Parivar. Next few decades have seen a steady growth in the influence of the Sangh Parivar in the social and political space of India.

Ideology

Economics
While the BJP governments have been progressively seen to be industry friendly, the opinions and the views of the Sangh Parivar constituents like Bharatiya Mazdoor Sangh (BMS) find consonance with the known leftist stands on labour rights. The Sangh Parivar, as a whole, even the BJP in its earlier days, has advocated 'Swadeshi' (Self Reliance). Sangh Parivar leaders have been very vocal in their criticism of globalization especially its impact on the poor and native people. They have been suspicious of the role of international agencies such as the World Bank and the International Monetary Fund. Sangh constituents have advocated and promoted decentralized village centric economic growth with emphasis on ecological protection.

Ecology
The constituents of the Sangh Parivar have been known for their demands for steps to "protect the environment, natural-ecology and agro-economy" and for establishment of a "self-reliant village-oriented economy". They have been vocal in their demand against the use of chemical fertilizers and have supported preservation and development of organic farming in India. Many of these views are seen to mirror the concerns of the Green party.

The Bharatiya Janata Party, a constituent of Sangh Parivar included the concerns on global warming in its election manifesto for the National Elections of 2009. The manifesto promised prioritising "combating climate change and global warming", "programmes to arrest the melting of Himalayan glaciers", "afforestation" and emphasis on "protecting India's biodiversity".

Reception
The Sangh Parivar has been described with monikers spanning the spectrum from "patriotic Hindus" and "Hindu nationalist". Some have also labeled them "Hindu chauvinist". While its constituent organisations present themselves as embedded in the traditional ethos of Hinduism, their ideological opponents have characterized them as the representatives of authoritarian, xenophobic and majoritarian religious nationalism in India, These organizations have been accused being involved with Saffron terror. Flemish Indologist and Hindutva supporter Koenraad Elst has challenged the critics, in his 2001 book The Saffron Swastika, he wrote "So far, the polemical arrows have all been shot from one side, replies from the other side being extremely rare or never more than piecemeal."

Social impact
The activities of the Sangh Parivar have had considerable social and religious impact. And considerable influence over country's educational, social and defense policies.

Social reform
In 1979, the religious wing of the Sangh Parivar, the Vishwa Hindu Parishad got the Hindu saints and religious leaders to reaffirm that untouchability and caste discrimination had no religious sanction in the Hindu scriptures and texts. The Vishwa Hindu Parishad is also spearheading efforts to ordain Dalits as priests in temples across India, positions that were earlier usually occupied only by people of "upper castes". In 1983, RSS founded a dalit organization called Samajik Samrasta Manch.

The leaders of the Sangh Parivar have also been involved in the campaigns against female fetocide and movements for the education. VHP founded a number of educational institutes such as Bharat Sevashram, Hindu Milan Mandir, Ekal Vidalayas and schools in tribal locations.

Social and political empowerment
The service programs, over the years, have led to the empowerment of the economically and socially underprivileged sections of the society, mostly the tribal, who have long remained politically under-represented. Babulal Marandi belonging to the tribal community, who was the organizing secretary of Vishwa Hindu Parishad, became the first Chief Minister of the state of Jharkhand. Other such leaders of Sangh Parivar who belong to the tribal community include Karia Munda, Jual Oram; both ministers in the Union Government led by Atal Bihari Vajpayee.

The emergence of the Sangh Parivar in Indian politics also brought many Dalits and representatives of the backward classes, who had been victims of social neglect, to prominent positions in the Government and Administration. Suraj Bhan, a dalit, who had been a member of the RSS, became the Governor of Uttar Pradesh, the most populous state in India, in 1998. Other leaders of the Sangh Parivar from the backward classes, who rose to prominence include Kalyan Singh, the former Chief Minister of UP, Uma Bharti, the former Chief Minister of MP, Narendra Modi, the incumbent Prime Minister of India, Gopinath Munde, the former Deputy Chief Minister of Maharashtra, and Shivraj Singh Chouhan, the former Chief Minister of Madhya Pradesh.

In many villages across India, Dharma Raksha Samitis (Duty/Religion Protection Committees) promote religious discourse and form an arena for bhajan performance. The Sangh sponsors calendars of Hindu deities and provides instruction on sanctioned methods of conducting Ganesh Chaturthi and Navaratri.

Politics
The Bharatiya Janata Party, which represents the Sangh Parivar in national politics, has formed three governments in India, most recently being in power from May 2014 under the leadership of Prime minister Narendra Modi, reelected in May 2019.

Political opponents of the BJP allege that the party's moderate face merely serves to cover the Sangh Parivar's "hidden agenda" of undiluted Hindutva, detectable by the BJP's efforts to change the content of history textbooks and syllabi as well as other aspects of the education system.

Such criticism of the BJP arises from the fact that BJP had only 2 seats in the parliament in 1984 and after the Babri Masjid demolition in 1992 the party gained national recognition, and only then it rose to power in 1998.

Babri Mosque demolition
According to the report of the UPA instituted Liberhan Commission the Sangh Parivar organised the destruction of the Babri Masjid. The Commission said- "The blame or the credit for the entire temple construction movement at Ayodhya must necessarily be attributed to the Sangh Parivar".

It also noted that the Sangh Parivar is an "extensive and widespread organic body", which encompasses organizations, which address and bring together just about every type of social, professional and other demographic grouping of individuals.

List of Sangh Parivar organisations 
The Sangh Parivar includes the following organisations (with membership figures in brackets). They are also categorized.

Political
 All Jammu and Kashmir Praja Parishad, literally, "People's Council", a political party active in Jammu from 1947 to 1963.
 Bharatiya Jana Sangh, literally, "Indian People's Association" a political party that existed from 1951 to 1977.
 Bharatiya Janata Party (BJP), Indian People's Party (150 million, August 2019)

Occupational and Professional
 Bharatiya Kisan Sangh, literally, Indian Farmers' Association (8m)
 Bharatiya Mazdoor Sangh, Indian Labourers' Association (10 million as of 2009)
 Bharatiya Railways Sangh, Indian Railways Workers' Association
 Fishermen's Co-operative Societies (2.2m)
 Sanskar Bharati, Organisation of Indian Artists
 Akhil Bharatiya Adhivakta Parishad, All India Lawyers' Council
 Akhil Bharatiya Vidyarthi Parishad, All India Students' Council (2.8m)
 Akhil Bharatiya Shaikshik Mahasangh, All India Teachers' Federation (1.8m)
 National Medicos Organisation, Organisation of Medical Practitioners
 Akhil Bharatiya Poorva Sainik Seva Parishad, (ABPSSP) All India Ex-Military Servicemen Council.

Economic
 Swadeshi Jagaran Manch, Nativist Awakening Front
 Vitta Salahkar Parishad, Financial consultants' association
 Laghu Udyog Bharati, an extensive network of small industries.
 Sahkar Bharati, Organisation of co-operatives

Social Services
 Deen Dayal Shodh Sansthan, for the development of rural areas on the basis of Integral Humanism (1.7m)
 My Home India - organization to promote nationalism and cultural assimilation between Northeast India and rest of India. Provide helpline to Northeast India people across the country.
 Bharat Vikas Parishad, Organization for the development & growth of India in all fields of human endeavor (1.8m)
 Vivekananda Medical Mission,  Sociomedical Services (1.7m)
 Seva Bharati, Organisation for service of the needy (founded in 1984)
 Sabarimala Ayyappa Seva Samajam
 Sakshama, an organization working among the blind
 Nele (a part of  "Hindu Seva Pratishthana"), Home for destitute Children
 Lok Bharati, National NGO's Front
 Seema Suraksha Parishad, Seemanta Chetana Mancha an organization working among the people of border districts

Exclusively Women
 Rashtra Sevika Samiti, literally, National Volunteer Association for Women (1.8m)
 Shiksha Bharati (2.1m), to provide education and training for skill up gradation to underprivileged girls and women.
 Durga Vahini, Women's wing of Vishwa Hindu Parishad.

Religious
 Vishwa Hindu Parishad, World Hindu Council (6.8m)
 Bajrang Dal, Literally, Brigade of Hanuman (3.8m)
 Hindu Jagarana Vedike, literally, National Volunteer Association for men to protect the Hindus
 Dharm Jagaran Samiti Organization for conversion of non-Hindus to Hinduism and their coordinating committee "Dharam Jagaran Samanvay Samiti"
 Rashtriya Hindu Andolan, based in Maharashtra calls for the deletion of "secular" from the Indian Constitution
 Rashtriya Sikh Sangat, a sociocultural organisation with the aim to spread the knowledge of Gurbani to the Indian society.
 Bhartiya Baudh Sangh, Indian Buddhist Association
 Muslim Rashtriya Manch,  National Front of Muslims
 Hindu Rashtra Sena, propagating for the establishment of Hindu Rashtra.

Regional based 
 Hindu Munnani, a religio-cultural organization based in Tamil Nadu.
 Hindu Aikya Vedi, Hindu United Front based in Kerala

Educational Organizations 
 Ekal Vidyalaya, Involved in free education and village development in rural areas and tribal villages of India.
 Saraswati Shishu Mandir, School
 Vidya Bharati Akhil Bharatiya Shiksha Sansthan, Educational Institutes
 Vijnana Bharati, Science Forum

Socio-Ethnic
 Vanavasi Kalyan Ashram, Organisation for the improvement of tribals
 Friends of Tribals Society
 Anusuchit Jati-Jamati Arakshan Bachao Parishad, Organisation for the improvement of Dalits
 Bharat-Tibet Maitri Sangh, India-Tibet Friendship Association

News & Communication
 Organiser,  Magazine
 Panchjanya (magazine) 
 Vishwa Samvad Kendra communication Wing, spread all over India for media related work, having a team of IT professionals 
 Hindustan Samachar a multi-lingual news agency.

Think Tanks
 Bharatiya Vichara Kendra, General Think Tank.
 Hindu Vivek Kendra, a resource center for the promotion of the ideology of Hindutva.
 Vivekananda Kendra, promotion of Swami Vivekananda's ideas with Vivekananda International Foundation in New Delhi as a "Public Policy Think Tank" with 6 Centres of study.
 India Policy Foundation, a not-for-profit Think Tank
 Bharatiya Shikshan Mandal, a Think Tank on educational reforms.
 India Foundation, a Think Tank
 Akhil Bharatiya Itihas Sankalan Yojana (ABISY), All-India history reform project
 Syama Prasad Mookerjee Research Foundation (SPMRF)

Overseas
 Hindu Swayamsevak Sangh, literally, Hindu Volunteer Association overseas wing of RSS
 Hindu Students Council, Overseas Hindu Students' Wing
National Hindu Students' Forum, Hindu student group in UK
Sewa International, UK based Charity 
India Development and Relief Fund, USA based charity
Rashtreeya bajrangdal {hanuman sena} 
Children

Others
 Samskrita Bharati, promotion of the Sanskrit language
 Central Hindu Military Education Society, to encourage more Hindus to join the Defence Services
 Kreeda Bharati, Sports Organization.
 Bharat Tibbat Sahyog Manch, and Bharat Tibbat Samanvay Sangh, organisations working with Tibetan expatriates in India.

See also
 Bibliography of the Sangh Parivar

References

Bibliography

 
 
 
 
 
 
 
 
 
 
 
 
 
 

 
Bharatiya Janata Party
Hindu nationalism